Plymouth is a port city and unitary authority in South West England. It is bordered by Cornwall to the west and south-west.

Plymouth's early history extends to the Bronze Age when a first settlement emerged at Mount Batten. This settlement continued as a trading post for the Roman Empire, until it was surpassed by the more prosperous village of Sutton founded in the ninth century, now called Plymouth. In 1588, an English fleet based in Plymouth intercepted and defeated the Spanish Armada. In 1620, the Pilgrim Fathers departed Plymouth for the New World and established Plymouth Colony, the second English settlement in what is now the United States of America. During the English Civil War, the town was held by the Parliamentarians and was besieged between 1642 and 1646.

Throughout the Industrial Revolution, Plymouth grew as a commercial shipping port, handling imports and passengers from the Americas, and exporting local minerals (tin, copper, lime, china clay and arsenic). The neighbouring town of Devonport became strategically important to the Royal Navy for its shipyards and dockyards.  In 1914, three neighbouring independent towns, viz. the county borough of Plymouth, the County Borough of Devonport, and the urban district of East Stonehouse were merged, becoming the County Borough of Plymouth. In 1928, it achieved city status.  During World War II, due to the city's naval importance, the German military targeted and partially destroyed the city by bombing, an act known as the Plymouth Blitz.  After the war, the city centre was completely rebuilt.  Subsequent expansion led to the incorporation of Plympton, Plymstock, and other outlying suburbs, in 1967.

The city is home to  people, making it the 30th-most populous built-up area in the United Kingdom and the second-largest city in the South West, after Bristol. It is governed locally by Plymouth City Council and is represented nationally by two MPs. Plymouth's economy remains strongly influenced by shipbuilding and seafaring but has tended toward a service economy since the 1990s.  It has ferry links to Brittany (Roscoff and St Malo) and to Spain (Santander). It has the largest operational naval base in Western Europe, HMNB Devonport, and is home to the University of Plymouth. Plymouth is categorized as a Small-Port City using the Southampton System for port-city classification.

History

Early history 
Upper Palaeolithic deposits, including bones of Homo sapiens, have been found in local caves, and artefacts dating from the Bronze Age to the Middle Iron Age have been found at Mount Batten, showing that it was one of few principal trading ports of pre-Roman Britannia dominating continental trade with Armorica. An unidentified settlement named TAMARI OSTIA (mouth/estuaries of the Tamar) is listed in Ptolemy's Geographia and is presumed to be located in the area of the modern city. An ancient promontory fort was located at Rame Head at the mouth of Plymouth Sound with ancient hillforts located at Lyneham Warren to the east, Boringdon Camp and Maristow Camp to the north.

The settlement of Plympton, further up the River Plym than the current Plymouth, was also an early trading port. As the river silted up in the early 11th century, mariners and merchants were forced to settle downriver, at the current day Barbican near the river mouth. At the time this village was called Sutton, meaning south town in Old English. The name Plym Mouth, meaning "mouth of the River Plym" was first mentioned in a Pipe Roll of 1211.
The name Plymouth first officially replaced Sutton in a charter of King Henry VI in 1440. See Plympton for the derivation of the name Plym.

Early defence and Renaissance 

During the Hundred Years' War a French attack (1340) burned a manor house and took some prisoners, but failed to get into the town. In 1403 the town was burned by Breton raiders. On 12 November 1439, the English Parliament made Plymouth the first town incorporated. In the late fifteenth century, Plymouth Castle, a "castle quadrate", was constructed close to the area now known as The Barbican; it included four round towers, one at each corner, as featured on the city coat of arms.

The castle served to protect Sutton Pool, which is where the fleet was based in Plymouth prior to the establishment of Plymouth Dockyard. In 1512, an Act of Parliament was passed to further fortify Plymouth. The work included defensive walls at the entrance to Sutton Pool (across which a chain was extended in times of danger). Defences on St Nicholas Island also date from this time, and a string of six artillery blockhouses were built, including one on Fishers Nose at the south-eastern corner of the Hoe. This location was further strengthened by the building of a fort (later known as Drake's Fort) in 1596; it was the site of the Citadel, established in the 1660s (see below).

During the 16th century, locally produced wool was the major export commodity. Plymouth was the home port for successful maritime traders, among them Sir John Hawkins, who led England's first foray into the Atlantic slave trade, as well as Sir Francis Drake, Mayor of Plymouth in 1581–2. Crews for the first English failed settlement attempt at Roanoke Colony in North America departed in 1587 under Sir Walter Raleigh's and Drake's leadership; returning bearing maize, tobacco and potatoes.
In 1588, according to legend, Drake insisted on completing his game of bowls on the Hoe before engaging the Spanish Armada. In 1620 the Pilgrims set sail for the New World from Plymouth, establishing Plymouth Colony – the second English colony in what is now the United States of America.

During the English Civil War Plymouth sided with the Parliamentarians and was besieged for almost four years by the Royalists. The last major attack by the Royalists was by Sir Richard Grenville leading thousands of soldiers towards Plymouth, but they were defeated by the Plymothians at Freedom Fields Park. The civil war ended as a Parliamentary win, but monarchy was restored by King Charles II in 1660, who imprisoned many of the Parliamentary heroes on Drake's Island. Construction of the Royal Citadel began in 1665, after the Restoration; it was armed with cannon facing both out to sea and into the town, rumoured to be a reminder to residents not to oppose the Crown. Mount Batten tower also dates from around this time.

Plymouth Dock, naval power and Foulston 

Throughout the 17th century, Plymouth had gradually lost its pre-eminence as a trading port. By the mid-17th century, commodities manufactured elsewhere in England cost too much to transport to Plymouth, and the city had no means of processing sugar or tobacco imports, major products from the colonies. Local sailors turning to piracy such as Henry Every became infamous, celebrated in the London play The Successful Pyrate. It played a part in the Atlantic slave trade during the early 18th century, although it was relatively small.

In the nearby parish of Stoke Damerel the first dockyard, HMNB Devonport, opened in 1690 on the eastern bank of the River Tamar. Further docks were built here in 1727, 1762 and 1793. The settlement that developed here was called "Dock" or "Plymouth Dock" at the time, and a new town, separate from Plymouth, grew up. In 1712 there were 318 men employed and by 1733 the population had grown to 3,000 people.

Before the latter half of the 18th century, grain, timber and then coal were Plymouth's main imports. During this time the real source of wealth was from the neighbouring town of Plymouth Dock (renamed in 1824 to Devonport) and the major employer in the entire region was the dockyard. The Three Towns conurbation of Plymouth, Stonehouse and Devonport enjoyed some prosperity during the late 18th and early 19th century and were enriched by a series of neo-classical urban developments designed by London architect John Foulston. Foulston was important for both Devonport and Plymouth and was responsible for several grand public buildings, many now destroyed, including the Athenaeum, the Theatre Royal and Royal Hotel, and much of Union Street.

Local chemist William Cookworthy established his short-lived Plymouth Porcelain venture in 1768 to exploit the deposits of china clay that he had discovered in Cornwall. He was acquainted with engineer John Smeaton, the builder of the third Eddystone Lighthouse.

The  Breakwater in Plymouth Sound was designed by John Rennie to protect the fleet moving in and out of Devonport; work started in 1812. Numerous technical difficulties and repeated storm damage meant that it was not completed until 1841, twenty years after Rennie's death. In the 1860s, a ring of Palmerston forts was constructed around the outskirts of Devonport, to protect the dockyard from attack from any direction.

Some of the most significant imports to Plymouth from the Americas and Europe during the latter half of the 19th century included maize, wheat, barley, sugar cane, guano, sodium nitrate and phosphate. Aside from the dockyard in the town of Devonport, industries in Plymouth such as the gasworks, the railways and tramways, and a number of small chemical works had begun to develop in the 19th century, continuing into the 20th century.

Plan for Plymouth 1943 
During the First World War, Plymouth was the port of entry for many troops from around the Empire. It was developed as a facility for the manufacture of munitions. Although major units of the Royal Navy moved to the safety of Scapa Flow, Devonport was an important base for escort vessels and repairs. Flying boats operated from Mount Batten.

During the Second World War, Devonport was the headquarters of Western Approaches Command until 1941, and Sunderland flying boats were operated by the Royal Australian Air Force. It was an important embarkation point for US troops for D-Day. The city was heavily bombed by the Luftwaffe, in a series of 59 raids known as the Plymouth Blitz. Although the dockyards were the principal targets, much of the city centre and over 3,700 houses were completely destroyed and more than 1,000 civilians lost their lives. This was largely due to Plymouth's status as a major port. Charles Church was hit by incendiary bombs and partially destroyed in 1941 during the Blitz, but has not been demolished. It has been designated as an official permanent monument to the bombing of Plymouth during World War II.

The redevelopment of the city was planned by Sir Patrick Abercrombie in his 1943 Plan for Plymouth whilst simultaneously working on the reconstruction plan for London. This initially included plans to expand the city into south east Cornwall, but these were abandoned after opposition from Cornwall County Council. Between 1951 and 1957 over 1000 homes were completed every year, mostly using innovative prefabricated systems of just three main types.

The Plan for Plymouth was, on the one hand, a template for the rapid reassembly of a destroyed city centre, but Abercrombie also took the opportunity to lay out a whole hierarchy of settlements across the city of communities, neighbourhoods and districts. Central to this was a revision of transport infrastructure that prioritised the position of the railway as a gateway to the city centre and provided in the long-term for a dual carriageway road by-pass that only finally came into being in the 1980s (forty years after being planned). The plan is the subject of Jill Craigie's documentary The Way We Live (1946).

By 1964 over 20,000 new homes had been built, transforming the dense overcrowded and unsanitary slums of the pre-war city into a low density, dispersed suburbia. Most of the city centre shops had been destroyed and those that remained were cleared to enable a zoned reconstruction according to his plan. In 1962 the modernist high rise of the Civic Centre was constructed, an architecturally significant example of mid-twentieth century civic slab-and-tower set piece. The Plymouth City Council allowed it to fall into disrepair but it was grade II listed in 2010 by English Heritage to prevent its demolition.

New light industrial factories were constructed in the newly zoned industrial sector, attracting rapid growth of the urban population. The army had substantially left the city by 1971, after barracks were pulled down in the 1960s, but the city remains home to 29 Commando Regiment Royal Artillery and also 42 Commando of the Royal Marines.

Government

Local government history 

The first record of the existence of a settlement at Plymouth was in the Domesday Book in 1086 as Sudtone, Saxon for south farm, located at the present-day Barbican. From Saxon times, it was in the hundred of Roborough. In 1254 it gained status as a town and in 1439, became the first town in England to be granted a Charter by Parliament. Between 1439 and 1934, Plymouth had a Mayor. In 1914 the county boroughs of Plymouth and Devonport, and the urban district of East Stonehouse merged to form a single county borough of Plymouth. Collectively they were referred to as "The Three Towns".

In 1919, Nancy Astor was elected the first-ever female member of parliament to take office in the British Houses of Parliament for the constituency of Plymouth Sutton. Taking over office from her husband Waldorf Astor, Lady Astor was a vibrantly active campaigner for her resident constituents. Plymouth was granted city status on 18 October 1928. The city's first Lord Mayor was appointed in 1935 and its boundaries further expanded in 1967 to include the town of Plympton and the parish of Plymstock.

In 1945, Plymouth-born Michael Foot was elected Labour MP for the war-torn constituency of Plymouth Devonport which he represented until 1955. After serving as Secretary of State for Education and being responsible for the 1974 Health and Safety at Work Act, went on to become the leader of the Labour Party (1980–1983).

The 1971 Local Government White Paper proposed abolishing county boroughs, which would have left Plymouth, a town of 250,000 people, being administered from a council based at the smaller Exeter, on the other side of the county. This led to Plymouth lobbying for the creation of a Tamarside county, to include Plymouth, Torpoint, Saltash, and the rural hinterland. The campaign was not successful, and Plymouth ceased to be a county borough on 1 April 1974 with responsibility for education, social services, highways and libraries transferred to Devon County Council. All powers returned when the city become a unitary authority on 1 April 1998 under recommendations of the Banham Commission.

In the Parliament of the United Kingdom, Plymouth is represented by the three constituencies of Plymouth Moor View, Plymouth Sutton and Devonport and South West Devon. Prior to Brexit in 2020 it was represented within the European Parliament as South West England. In the 2017 general election the city two returned Conservative MPs, who were Gary Streeter (for South West Devon) and Johnny Mercer (for Moor View), and one Labour MP, Luke Pollard (for Sutton and Devonport), .

City Council 

The City of Plymouth is divided into 20 wards, 17 of which elect three councillors and the other three electing two councillors, making up a total council of 57. Each year a third of the council is up for election for three consecutive years – there are no elections on the following "fourth" year, which is when County Council elections take place. The total electorate for Plymouth's Parliamentary constituencies was 190,006 in April 2019. Since May 2021 Plymouth has had a Conservative majority Council. Plymouth City Council is formally twinned with: Brest, France (1963), Gdynia, Poland (1976), Novorossiysk, Russia (1990) San Sebastián, Spain (1990) and Plymouth, United States (2001).

Plymouth was granted the dignity of Lord Mayor by King George V in 1935. The position is elected each year by a group of six councillors. It is traditional that the position of the Lord Mayor alternates between the Conservative Party and the Labour Party annually and that the Lord Mayor chooses the Deputy Lord Mayor. Conservative councillor Dr John Mahony is the incumbent for 2015–16.

The Lord Mayor's official residence is 3 Elliot Terrace, located on the Hoe. Once a home of Waldorf and Nancy Astor, it was given by Lady Astor to the City of Plymouth as an official residence for future Lord Mayors and is also used today for civic hospitality, as lodgings for visiting dignitaries and High Court judges and it is also available to hire for private events. The Civic Centre municipal office building in Armada Way became a listed building in June 2007 because of its quality and period features, but has become the centre of a controversy as the council planned for its demolition estimating that it could cost £40m to refurbish it, resulting in possible job losses.

Geography 

Plymouth lies between the River Plym to the east and the River Tamar to the west; both rivers flow into the natural harbour of Plymouth Sound. Since 1967, the unitary authority of Plymouth has included the, once independent, towns of Plympton and Plymstock which lie along the east of the River Plym. The River Tamar forms the county boundary between Devon and Cornwall and its estuary forms the Hamoaze on which is sited Devonport Dockyard.

The River Plym, which flows off Dartmoor to the north-east, forms a smaller estuary to the east of the city called Cattewater. Plymouth Sound is protected from the sea by the Plymouth Breakwater, in use since 1814. In the Sound is Drake's Island which is seen from Plymouth Hoe, a flat public area on top of limestone cliffs.

Geologically, Plymouth has a mixture of limestone, Devonian slate, granite and Middle Devonian limestone. Plymouth Sound, Shores and Cliffs is a Site of Special Scientific Interest, because of its geology. The bulk of the city is built upon Upper Devonian slates and shales and the headlands at the entrance to Plymouth Sound are formed of Lower Devonian slates, which can withstand the power of the sea.

A band of Middle Devonian limestone runs west to east from Cremyll to Plymstock including the Hoe. Local limestone may be seen in numerous buildings, walls and pavements throughout Plymouth. To the north and northeast of the city is the granite mass of Dartmoor; the granite was mined and exported via Plymouth. Rocks brought down the Tamar from Dartmoor include ores containing tin, copper, tungsten, lead and other minerals. There is evidence that the middle Devonian limestone belt at the south edge of Plymouth and in Plymstock was quarried at West Hoe, Cattedown and Radford.

Urban form 

On 27 April 1944 Sir Patrick Abercrombie's Plan for Plymouth to rebuild the bomb-damaged city was published; it called for demolition of the few remaining pre-War buildings in the city centre to make way for their replacement with wide, parallel, modern boulevards aligned east–west linked by a north–south avenue (Armada Way) linking the railway station with the vista of Plymouth Hoe.

A peripheral road system connecting the historic Barbican on the east and Union Street to the west determines the principal form of the city centre, even following pedestrianisation of the shopping centre in the late 1980s, and continues to inform the present 'Vision for Plymouth' developed by a team led by Barcelona-based architect David MacKay in 2003 which calls for revivification of the city centre with mixed-use and residential.

In suburban areas, post-War prefabs had already begun to appear by 1946, and over 1,000 permanent council houses were built each year from 1951 to 1957 according to the Modernist zoned low-density garden city model advocated by Abercrombie. By 1964 over 20,000 new homes had been built, more than 13,500 of them permanent council homes and 853 built by the Admiralty.

Its largest park is Central Park, with other sizeable green spaces including Victoria Park, Freedom Fields Park, Alexandra Park, Devonport Park and the Hoe. Central Park is the home of Plymouth Argyle Football Club and a number of other leisure facilities.

The Plymouth Plan 2019–2034 was published May 2019 and sets the direction for future development with a new spatial strategy which reinforces links with the wider region in west Devon and east Cornwall in its Joint Local Plan and identifies three development areas within the city: the City centre and waterfront; a 'northern corridor' including Derriford and the vacant airfield site at Roborough; and an 'eastern corridor' including major new settlements at Sherford and Langage.

Climate 

Plymouth has a moderated temperate oceanic climate (Köppen Cfb) which is wetter and milder than the rest of England. This means a wide range of exotic plants, palm trees, and yuccas can be cultivated. Due to the moderating effect of the sea and the south-westerly location, the climate is among the mildest of British cities, and one of the warmest UK cities in winter. Snow usually falls in small amounts but a noteworthy recent exception was the period of the European winter storms of 2009–10 which, in early January 2010, covered Plymouth in at least  of snow; more on higher ground.

South West England has a favoured location when the Azores High pressure area extends north-eastwards towards the UK, particularly in summer. Coastal areas have average annual sunshine totals over 1,600 hours.

Owing to its geographic location, rainfall tends to be associated with Atlantic depressions or with convection and is more frequent and heavier than in London and southeast England. The Atlantic depressions are more vigorous in autumn and winter and most of the rain which falls in those seasons in the south-west is from this source. November to March have the highest mean wind speeds, with June to August having the lightest winds. The predominant wind direction is from the south-west.

Typically, 18.6 nights of the year will register an air frost.

Education 

There are three universities based in Plymouth, the University of Plymouth, the University of St Mark & St John, and the Arts University Plymouth.

The University of Plymouth enrolls 23,155 total students as of 2018/2019 ( largest in the UK out of ). It also employs 2,900 staff with an annual income of around £160 million. It was founded in 1992 from Polytechnic South West (formerly Plymouth Polytechnic) following the Further and Higher Education Act 1992. It has a wide range of courses including those in marine focused business, marine engineering, marine biology and Earth, ocean and environmental sciences, surf science, shipping and logistics. The university formed a joint venture with the fellow Devonian University of Exeter in 2000, establishing the Peninsula College of Medicine and Dentistry. The college is ranked 8th out of 30 universities in the UK in 2011 for medicine. Its dental school was established in 2006, which also provides free dental care in an attempt to improve access to dental care in the South West.

The University of St Mark & St John (known as "Marjon" or "Marjons") specialises in teacher training, and offers training across the country and abroad.

Arts University Plymouth offers a selection of courses including media. It was originally founded as the Plymouth Drawing School in 1856, and in December 2008, Plymouth College of Art and Design was renamed to Plymouth College of Art. In May 2022, the College was awarded University status, and became Arts University Plymouth.

The city is also home to two large colleges. The City College Plymouth provides courses from the most basic to Foundation degrees for approximately 26,000 students. 

Plymouth also has 71 state primary phase schools, 13 state secondary schools, eight special schools and three selective state grammar schools, Devonport High School for Girls, Devonport High School for Boys and Plymouth High School for Girls. There is also an independent school Plymouth College.

The city was also home to the Royal Naval Engineering College; opened in 1880 in Keyham, it trained engineering students for five years before they completed the remaining two years of the course at Greenwich. The college closed in 1910, but in 1940 a new college opened at Manadon. This was renamed Dockyard Technical College in 1959 before finally closing in 1994; training was transferred to the University of Southampton.

Plymouth is home to the Marine Biological Association of the United Kingdom (MBA; founded 1884) which conducts research in all areas of the marine sciences. The Plymouth Marine Laboratory (PML; founded 1988) was formed in part from components of the MBA. Together with the National Marine Aquarium, the Sir Alister Hardy Foundation for Ocean Sciences, Plymouth University's Marine Institute and the Diving Diseases Research Centre, these marine-related organisations form the Plymouth Marine Sciences Partnership. The Plymouth Marine Laboratory, which focuses on global issues of climate change and sustainability. It monitors the effects of ocean acidity on corals and shellfish and reports the results to the UK government. It also cultivates algae that could be used to make biofuels or in the treatment of wastewater by using technology such as photo-bioreactors. It works alongside the Boots Group to investigate the use of algae in skincare protects, taking advantage of the chemicals they contain that adapt to protect themselves from the sun.

A scheme is in operation over summer 2018 to provide meals during the summer holidays for children with parents on a low income, the parents cannot afford to provide their children with healthy meals.

UPSU also known as the University of Plymouth Student Union is based underground near the library. Every student at the University of Plymouth is a member of UPSU. The Union employs students across the University, from bar staff to events technicians. Every year the students at the University have an opportunity to vote which sabbatical officers represent them. In 2019 over 4000 students voted in the UPSU elections.

Demography 

From the 2011 Census, the Office for National Statistics published that Plymouth's unitary authority area population was 256,384; 15,664 more people than that of the last census from 2001, which indicated that Plymouth had a population of 240,720. The Plymouth urban area had a population of 260,203 in 2011 (the urban sprawl which extends outside the authority's boundaries). The city's average household size was 2.3 persons. At the time of the 2011 UK census, the ethnic composition of Plymouth's population was 96.2% White (of 92.9% was White British), with the largest minority ethnic group being Chinese at 0.5%. The white Irish ethnic group saw the largest decline in its share of the population since the 2001 Census (−24%), while the Other Asian and Black African had the largest increases (360% and 351% respectively). This excludes the two new ethnic groups added to the 2011 census of Gypsy or Irish Traveller and Arab. The population rose rapidly during the second half of the 19th century, but declined by over 1.6% from 1931 to 1951.

Plymouth's gross value added (a measure of the size of its economy) was 5,169 million GBP in 2013 making up 25% of Devon's GVA. Its GVA per person was £19,943 and compared to the national average of £23,755, was £3,812 lower. Plymouth's unemployment rate was 7.0% in 2014 which was 2.0 points higher than the South West average and 0.8 points higher than the average for Great Britain (England, Wales and Scotland).

A 2014 profile by the National Health Service showed Plymouth had higher than average levels of poverty and deprivation (26.2% of the population among the poorest 20.4% nationally). Life expectancy, at 78.3 years for men and 82.1 for women, was the lowest of any region in the South West of England.

Economy 

Because of its coastal location, the economy of Plymouth has traditionally been maritime, in particular the defence sector with over 12,000 people employed and approximately 7,500 in the armed forces. The Plymouth Gin Distillery has been producing Plymouth Gin since 1793, which was exported around the world by the Royal Navy. During the 1930s, it was the most widely distributed gin and had a controlled term of origin until 2015. Since the 1980s, employment in the defence sector has decreased substantially and the public sector is now prominent particularly in administration, health, education, medicine and engineering.

Devonport Dockyard is the UK's only naval base that refits nuclear submarines and the Navy estimates that the Dockyard generates about 10% of Plymouth's income. Plymouth has the largest cluster of marine and maritime businesses in the south west with 270 firms operating within the sector. Other substantial employers include the university with almost 3,000 staff, the national retail chain The Range at their Estover headquarters, as well as the Plymouth Science Park employing 500 people in 50 companies.

Plymouth has a post-war shopping area in the city centre with substantial pedestrianisation. At the west end of the zone inside a grade II listed building is the Pannier Market that was completed in 1959 – pannier meaning "basket" from French, so it translates as "basket market". In terms of retail floorspace, Plymouth is ranked in the top five in the South West, and 29th nationally. Plymouth was one of the first ten British cities to trial the new Business improvement district initiative. The Tinside Pool is situated at the foot of the Hoe and became a grade II listed building in 1998 before being restored to its 1930s look for £3.4 million.

Plymouth 2020 

Since 2003, Plymouth Council has been undertaking a project of urban redevelopment called the "Vision for Plymouth" launched by the architect David Mackay and backed by both Plymouth City Council and the Plymouth Chamber of Commerce (PCC). Its projects range from shopping centres, a cruise terminal, a boulevard and to increase the population to 300,000 and build 33,000 dwellings.

In 2004 the old Drake Circus shopping centre and Charles Cross car park were demolished and replaced by the latest Drake Circus Shopping Centre, which opened in October 2006. It received negative feedback before opening when David Mackay said it was already "ten years out of date". It was awarded the first ever Carbuncle Cup, awarded for Britain's ugliest building, in 2006. In contrast, the Theatre Royal's production and education centre, TR2, which was built on wasteland at Cattedown, was a runner-up for the RIBA Stirling Prize for Architecture in 2003.

There is a project involving the future relocation of Plymouth City Council's headquarters, the civic centre, to the current location of the Bretonside bus station; it would involve both the bus station and civic centre being demolished and a rebuilt together at the location with the land from the civic centre being sold off. Other suggestions include the demolition of the Plymouth Pavilions entertainment arena to create a canal "boulevard" linking Millbay to the city centre. Millbay is being regenerated with mixed residential, retail and office space alongside the ferry port.

Transport

Motorways 
The A38 dual-carriageway runs from east to west across the north of the city. Within the city it is known as 'The Parkway' and represents the boundary between the older parts of the city and more recently developed suburban areas. Bus services are mainly provided by Plymouth Citybus and Stagecoach South West, but a few routes are served by smaller local operators. Long distance intercity bus services terminate at Plymouth coach station. There are three Park and ride services at Milehouse, Coypool (Plympton) and George Junction (Plymouth City Airport), which are operated by Stagecoach South West.

Ferries 

A regular international ferry service provided by Brittany Ferries operates from Millbay taking cars and foot passengers directly to France (Roscoff) and Spain (Santander) on the three ferries, MV Armorique, MV Bretagne and MV Pont-Aven. The Cremyll Ferry is a passenger ferry between Stonehouse and the Cornish hamlet of Cremyll, which is believed to have operated continuously since 1204. There is also a pedestrian ferry from the Mayflower Steps to Mount Batten, and an alternative to using the Tamar Bridge via the Torpoint Ferry (vehicle and pedestrian) across the River Tamar.

Air 
The airport was home to the local airline Air Southwest,
which operated flights across the United Kingdom and Ireland. In June 2003, a report by the South West RDA was published looking at the future of aviation in the south-west and the possible closure of airports. It concluded that the best option for the south-west was to close Plymouth City Airport and expand Exeter International Airport and Newquay Cornwall Airport, although it did conclude that this was not the best option for Plymouth. In April 2011, it was announced that the airport would close, which it did on 23 December. A local company, FlyPlymouth, put forward plans in 2015 to reopen the airport by 2018, providing daily services to various destinations including London, but as of now, these projects have stalled.

Rail 
Plymouth railway station, which opened on its present site in 1877, is managed by Great Western Railway and is also served by trains on the CrossCountry network. The station was previously named Plymouth North Road, when there were other main line stations in the city at Millbay and Friary. These have now closed. Smaller stations in the suburban area west of the city centre are served by trains on the Tamar Valley Line to Gunnislake and local services on the Cornish Main Line, which crosses the Tamar on the Royal Albert Bridge. This was designed by Brunel and opened in 1859. The parallel road bridge was completed in 1961.

There have been proposals to reopen the Exeter to Plymouth railway of the LSWR which would connect Cornwall and Plymouth to Exeter using the former Southern Railway main line from Plymouth to Exeter via Okehampton, because the main line through South Devon is vulnerable to damage from rough seas at Dawlish, where some of the cliffs are also fragile. There are related proposals to reopen part of the old main line from Bere Alston on the Plymouth-Gunnislake line as far as Tavistock to serve a new housing development, but although the idea has been discussed since 2008 at least progress has been slow.

Cycle routes 
The route runs mostly traffic-free on off-road sections between Ilfracombe and Plymouth. The route uses former railway lines, though there are some stretches on public roads.

Religion 

Plymouth has about 150 churches city-wide. The Plymouth Cathedral is Roman Catholic, and is located in Stonehouse. It was opened in 1858, and consecrated in 1880. The city's oldest church is Plymouth Minster, also known as St Andrew's Church, (Anglican) located at the top of Royal Parade—it is the largest parish church in Devon and has been a site of gathering since AD 800. The city also includes five Baptist churches, over twenty Methodist chapels, and thirteen Roman Catholic churches. In 1831 the first Brethren assembly in England, a movement of conservative non-denominational Evangelical Christians, was established in the city, so that Brethren are often called Plymouth Brethren, although the movement did not begin locally.

Plymouth has the first known reference to Jews in the South West from Sir Francis Drake's voyages in 1577 to 1580, as his log mentioned "Moses the Jew" – a man from Plymouth. The Plymouth Synagogue is a Listed Grade II* building, built in 1762 and is the oldest Ashkenazi Synagogue in the English speaking world. There are also places of worship for Islam, Baháʼí, Buddhism, Unitarianism, Chinese beliefs and Humanism.

58.1% of the population described themselves in the 2011 census return as being at least nominally Christian and 0.8% as Muslim with all other religions represented by less than 0.5% each. The portion of people without a religion is 32.9%; above the national average of 24.7%. 7.1% did not state their religious belief. Since the 2001 Census, the number of Christians and Jews has decreased (−16% and −7% respectively), while all other religions have increased and non-religious people have almost doubled in number.

Culture 

Built in 1815, Union Street was at the heart of Plymouth's historical culture. It became known as the servicemen's playground, as it was where sailors from the Royal Navy would seek entertainment of all kinds. During the 1930s, there were 30 pubs and it attracted such performers as Charlie Chaplin to the New Palace Theatre. It was described in 2008 as the late-night hub of Plymouth's entertainment strip.

Outdoor events and festivals are held including the annual British Firework Championships in August, which attracts tens of thousands of people across the waterfront. In August 2006 the world record for the most simultaneous fireworks was surpassed, by Roy Lowry of the University of Plymouth, over Plymouth Sound. From 2014 MTV Crashes Plymouth has taken place every July on Plymouth Hoe, hosting big-name acts such as The 1975, Little Mix, Tinie Tempah and Busted. Between 1992 and 2012 the Music of the Night celebration was performed in the Royal Citadel by the 29 Commando Regiment and local performers to raise money for local and military charities. A number of other smaller cultural events taken place annually, including Plymouth Art Weekender, Plymouth Fringe Festival and Illuminate Festival.

The city's main theatre is Theatre Royal Plymouth, presenting large-scale West End shows and smaller works as well as an extensive education and outreach programme. The main building is located in the city centre and contains three performance spaces – The Lyric (1,315 capacity), Drum Theatre (200 capacity), and The Lab (60 capacity) – and they also run their own specialised production and creative learning centre called TR2, based in Cattedown. Plymouth Pavilions has multiple uses for the city staging music concerts, basketball matches and stand-up comedy. There are also three cinemas: Reel Cinema at Derrys Cross, Plymouth Arts Centre at Looe Street and a Vue cinema at the Barbican Leisure Park. Barbican Theatre, Plymouth delivers a theatre and dance programme of performances and workshops focused on young people and emerging artists contains a main auditorium (110 – 140 capacity) and rehearsal studio; they also host the B-Bar (80 capacity), which offers a programme of music, comedy and spoken word performance. The Plymouth Athenaeum, which includes a local interest library, is a society dedicated to the promotion of learning in the fields of science, technology, literature and art. In 2017 its auditorium (340 capacity) returned to use as a theatre, having been out of service since 2009. The Plymouth City Museum and Art Gallery is operated by Plymouth City Council allowing free admission – it has six galleries.

Plymouth is the regional television centre of BBC South West. A team of journalists are headquartered at Plymouth for the ITV West Country regional station, after a merger with ITV West forced ITV Westcountry to close on 16 February 2009. The main local newspapers serving Plymouth are The Herald and Western Morning News with Greatest Hits Radio South West, BBC Radio Devon, Heart West, and Pirate FM being the local radio stations with the most listeners.

Sport 

Plymouth is home to Plymouth Argyle F.C., who play in the third tier of English football league known as Football League One. The team's home ground is called Home Park and is located in Central Park. It links itself with the group of English non-conformists that left Plymouth for the New World in 1620: its nickname is "The Pilgrims". The city also has three Non-League football clubs; Plymouth Parkway who play at Bolitho Park, Elburton Villa who play at Haye Road and Plymstock United who play at Dean Cross. Plymouth Parkway were recently promoted to the Western League from the South West Peninsula League, and after two Covid-19 interrupted years to the Southern Football League in 2021, whilst Elburton Villa and Plymstock United continue to compete in the South West Peninsula League.

Other sports clubs include Plymouth Albion, Plymouth City Patriots and Plymouth Gladiators.

Plymouth Albion Rugby Football Club is a rugby union club that was founded in 1875 and are currently competing in the third tier of Professional English Rugby the National League 1. They play at the Brickfields. Plymouth Raiders played in the British Basketball League – the top tier of British basketball and were founded in 1983. 
Since 2021 the Raiders have been replaced by the Plymouth City Patriots. Both teams have been based in the Plymouth Pavilions entertainment arena. 
Plymouth Gladiators are a speedway team, currently competing in the British National League, with home meetings taking place at the Plymouth Coliseum. Plymouth cricket club was formed in 1843, the current 1st XI play in the Devon Premier League. Plymouth is also home to Plymouth Marjons Hockey Club, with their 1st XI playing in the National League last season. Plymouth Mariners Baseball club play in the South West Baseball League, they play their home games at Wilson Field in Central Park. Plymouth was home to an American football club, the Plymouth Admirals until 2010.

Plymouth Leander is the most successful swimming club in Great Britain along with Plymouth Diving Club.

Plymouth is an important centre for watersports, especially scuba diving and sailing. The Port of Plymouth Regatta is one of the oldest regattas in the world, and has been held regularly since 1823. In September 2011, Plymouth hosted the America's Cup World Series for nine days.

Public services 

Since 1973 Plymouth has been supplied water by South West Water. Prior to the 1973 take over it was supplied by Plymouth County Borough Corporation. Before the 19th century two leats were built to provide drinking water for the town. They carried water from Dartmoor to Plymouth. A watercourse, known as Plymouth or Drake's Leat, was opened on 24 April 1591 to tap the River Meavy. The Devonport Leat was constructed to carry fresh drinking water to the expanding town of Devonport and its ever-growing dockyard. It was fed by three Dartmoor rivers: The West Dart, Cowsic and Blackabrook. It seems to have been carrying water since 1797, but it was officially completed in 1801. It was originally designed to carry water to Devonport town but has since been shortened and now carries water to Burrator Reservoir, which feeds most of the water supply of Plymouth.

Plymouth City Council is responsible for waste management throughout the city and South West Water is responsible for sewerage. Plymouth's electricity is supplied from the National Grid and distributed to Plymouth via Western Power Distribution. On the outskirts of Plympton a combined cycle gas-powered station, the Langage Power Station, which started to produce electricity for Plymouth at the end of 2009.

Her Majesty's Courts Service provide a magistrates' court and a Combined Crown and County Court Centre in the city. The Plymouth Borough Police, formed in 1836, eventually became part of Devon and Cornwall Constabulary. There are police stations at Charles Cross and Crownhill (the Divisional HQ) and smaller stations at Plympton and Plymstock. The city has one of the Devon and Cornwall Area Crown Prosecution Service Divisional offices. Plymouth has five fire stations located in Camel's Head, Crownhill, Greenbank, Plympton and Plymstock which is part of Devon and Somerset Fire and Rescue Service. The Royal National Lifeboat Institution have an Atlantic 85 class lifeboat and Severn class lifeboat stationed at Millbay Docks.

The Royal Eye Infirmary is located at Derriford Hospital. South Western Ambulance Service NHS Foundation Trust operates in Plymouth and the rest of the south west; its headquarters are in Exeter.

The mid-19th-century burial ground at Ford Park Cemetery was reopened in 2007 by a successful trust and the City council operate two large early 20th century cemeteries at Weston Mill and Efford both with crematoria and chapels. There is also a privately owned cemetery on the outskirts of the city, Drake Memorial Park which does not allow headstones to mark graves, but a brass plaque set into the ground.

Landmarks and tourist attractions 

After the English Civil War the Royal Citadel was erected in 1666 towards the eastern section of Plymouth Hoe, to defend the port from naval attacks, suppress Plymothian Parliamentary leanings and to train the armed forces. Currently, guided tours are available in the summer months. Further west is Smeaton's Tower, which is a standard lighthouse that was constructed in 1759.   Furthermore, Smeaton's Tower was dismantled in 1877 and the top two-thirds were reassembled on Plymouth Hoe. It is open to the public and has views over the Plymouth Sound and the city from the lantern room. Plymouth has 20 war memorials of which nine are on The Hoe including: Plymouth Naval Memorial, to remember those killed in World Wars I and II, and the Armada Memorial, to commemorate the defeat of the Spanish Armada.

The early port settlement of Plymouth, called "Sutton", approximates to the area now referred to as the Barbican and has 100 listed buildings and the largest concentration of cobbled streets in Britain. The Pilgrim Fathers left for the New World in 1620 near the commemorative Mayflower Steps in Sutton Pool. Also on Sutton Pool is the National Marine Aquarium which displays 400 marine species and includes Britain's deepest aquarium tank.

 upstream on the opposite side of the River Plym is the Saltram estate, which has a Jacobean and Georgian mansion.

On the northern outskirts of the city, Crownhill Fort is a well-restored example of a "Palmerston's Folly". It is owned by the Landmark Trust and is open to the public.

To the west of the city is Devonport, one of Plymouth's historic quarters. As part of Devonport's millennium regeneration project, the Devonport Heritage Trail has been introduced, complete with over 70 waymarkers outlining the route.

Plymouth is often used as a base by visitors to Dartmoor, the Tamar Valley and the beaches of south-east Cornwall. Kingsand, Cawsand and Whitsand Bay are popular.

The Roland Levinsky building, the landmark building of the University of Plymouth, is located in the city's central quarter. Designed by leading architect Henning Larsen, the building was opened in 2008 and houses the University's Arts faculty.

Beckley Point, at 78m / 20 floors, is Plymouth's tallest building and was completed on 8 February 2018.  It was designed by Boyes Rees Architects and built by contractors Kier.

Notable people 

People from Plymouth are known as Plymothians or less formally as Janners. Its meaning is described as a person from Devon, deriving from Cousin Jan (the Devon form of John), but more particularly in naval circles anyone from the Plymouth area.

The Elizabethan navigator, Sir Francis Drake was born in the nearby town of Tavistock and was the mayor of Plymouth. He was the first Englishman to circumnavigate the world and was known by the Spanish as El Draco meaning "The Dragon" after he raided many of their ships. He died of dysentery in 1596 off the coast of Portobelo, Panama. In 2002 a mission to recover his body and bring it to Plymouth was allowed by the Ministry of Defence. His cousin and contemporary John Hawkins was a Plymouth man. 

Painter Sir Joshua Reynolds, founder and first president of the Royal Academy was born and educated in nearby Plympton, now part of Plymouth. William Cookworthy born in Kingsbridge set up his successful porcelain business in the city and was a close friend of John Smeaton designer of the Eddystone Lighthouse. Benjamin Robert Haydon, an English painter who specialised in grand historical pictures, was born here in 1786. The naturalist Dr William Elford Leach FRS, who did much to pave the way in Britain for Charles Darwin, was born at Hoe Gate in 1791.

Antarctic explorers Robert Falcon Scott who was born in Plymouth and Frank Bickerton both lived in the city. Artists include Beryl Cook whose paintings depict the culture of Plymouth and Robert Lenkiewicz, whose paintings investigated themes of vagrancy, sexual behaviour and suicide, lived in the city from the 1960s until his death in 2002. Illustrator and creator of children's series Mr Benn and King Rollo, David McKee, was born and brought up in South Devon and trained at Plymouth College of Art. Jazz musician John Surman, born in nearby Tavistock, has close connections to the area, evidenced by his 2012 album Saltash Bells. The avant garde prepared guitarist Keith Rowe was born in the city before establishing the jazz free improvisation band AMM in London in 1965 and MIMEO in 1997. The musician and film director Cosmo Jarvis has lived in several towns in South Devon and has filmed videos in and around Plymouth. In addition, actors Sir Donald Sinden and Judi Trott were born in Plymouth. George Passmore of Turner Prize winning duo Gilbert and George was also born in the city, as was Labour politician Michael Foot whose family reside at nearby Trematon Castle.

Notable athletes include swimmer Sharron Davies, diver Tom Daley, dancer Wayne Sleep, and footballer Trevor Francis. Other past residents include composer journalist and newspaper editor William Henry Wills, Ron Goodwin, and journalist Angela Rippon and comedian Dawn French. Canadian politician and legal scholar Chris Axworthy hails from Plymouth. America based actor Donald Moffat, whose roles include American Vice President Lyndon B. Johnson in the film The Right Stuff, and fictional President Bennett in Clear and Present Danger, was born in Plymouth. Canadian actor Mark Holden was also born in Plymouth. 
Kevin Owen is an international TV news anchor who was born in Freedom Fields Hospital, while his father served as a Royal Navy officer. Cambridge spy Guy Burgess was born at 2 Albemarle Villas, Stoke whilst his father was a serving Royal Navy officer.

Twin city 
 Brest, France
 Gdynia, Poland
 Novorossiysk, Russia
 Plymouth, Massachusetts, United States
 San Sebastián, Spain
 Jiaxing, China

Freedom of the City
The following People, Military Units and Organisations and Groups have received the Freedom of the City of Plymouth.

Individuals
 Mark Ormrod: 22 November 2021.
 Thomas Robert Daley: 17 February 2022.

Military Units
 42 Commando, RM: 1955.
 The Merchant Navy: 22 March 2009.
 The Rifles: 25 September 2010.
 The Ministry of Defence Hospital Unit Derriford: 30 January 2023.

Organisations and Groups
 Veterans of the Falklands War: 25 June 2022.

See also 

 Fortifications of Plymouth
 Grade I listed buildings in Plymouth
 Grade II* listed buildings in Plymouth

Notes

References

Further reading 
 Gould, Jeremy (2010). Plymouth: Vision of a modern city. English Heritage 

 
 
 
  N.B. Carew refers to Plymouth Hoe as "the Hawe at Plymmouth"
  N.B. the publication carries the date 1943, although published on 27 April 27, 1944 A Plan for Plymouth – The Encyclopaedia of Plymouth History
 W Best Harris – Plymouth – Plymouth Council of Social Service (undated)
 W Best Harris – Stories From Plymouth's History – Self-Published, Plymouth (undated)
 W Best Harris – The Book of Plymouth – Guild of Social Service, Plymouth (undated)
 W Best Harris – The New Book of Plymouth – Guild of Social Service, Plymouth (undated)
 W Best Harris – The Second Book of Plymouth – Guild of Social Service, Plymouth, 1957
 W Best Harris – Place Names of Plymouth, Dartmoor and the Tamar Valley – Self-Published, Plymouth, 1983
 W Best Harris – Welcome to Plymouth – Plymouth City Council (undated)

External links 

 Plymouth City Council website 
 Plymouth City Council's open data website
 

 
Cities in South West England
Towns in Devon
Non-metropolitan districts of Devon
Populated coastal places in Devon
Port cities and towns in South West England
Unitary authority districts of England
Unparished areas in Devon
Boroughs in England